Yakuplar can refer to:

 Yakuplar, Bolu
 Yakuplar, Çerkeş